Sendrick Sentel Van Pran (born October 23, 2001) is an American football center for the Georgia Bulldogs.

Career
Van Pran attended Warren Easton Charter High School in New Orleans, Louisiana. He was a four-year starter at center in high school. He committed to the University of Georgia to play college football.

After spending his true freshman year in 2020 as a backup, Van Pran started all 15 games at center in 2021. He was part of the team that defeated Alabama in the National Championship. He returned to Georgia as the starter in 2022.

References

External links
Georgia Bulldogs bio

Living people
Players of American football from New Orleans
American football centers
Georgia Bulldogs football players
2001 births